The 53rd Writers Guild of America Awards honored the best writing in film, television and radio of 2000. Nominees for television and radio were announced on January 10, 2001, while nominees for film were announced on February 7, 2001. Winners were announced on March 4, 2001 in joint ceremonies at the Beverly Hilton Hotel in Beverly Hills, California and at the Plaza Hotel in New York City, New York. The ceremonies were hosted by Geoffrey Rush, Greg Kinnear, Kelsey Grammer, and Stockard Channing.

Winners and nominees

Notes
 Nominees for television and radio were originally broadcast between September 1, 1999 and August 31, 2000.
 Winners are in bold (some categories resulted in a tie, allowing two winners for some awards).

Film

Television

Documentary

News

Radio

Promotional Writing

Special Awards

References

2000s
2000 film awards
2000 television awards
Writ
2000 guild awards
2000 in American cinema
2000 in American television
March 2001 events in the United States